The Institute for Sustainability and Innovation in Structural Engineering (ISISE) is a research unit funded by the Portuguese Foundation for Science and Technology (Fundação para a Ciência e Tecnologia), incorporating University of Coimbra and University of Minho as hosting institutions in Portugal. The Unit is organised in three research groups, addressing the topics of construction technologies in historical materials and masonry, steel and mixed materials, and concrete. 
In summary, ISISE aims at promoting innovation and sustainability, with a close link to the construction sector industry. The most relevant focus areas include:
 Characterisation of building materials
 Constitutive and structural modelling
 Characterisation of structural behaviour
 Inspection, assessment and monitoring of existing structures
 Safety evaluation of structures
 Development of an integrated life-time structural approach and tools for monitoring of existing structures
 Design of sustainable structures
The Institute is involved in several Advanced Educational Programs, including two Erasmus Mundus International Masters, funded by the European Commission, four PhD programs, as well as 5 advanced MSc programs.

Evaluation by the Portuguese Foundation for Science and Technology
In the latest (2014) Evaluation of R&D Units by FCT, ISISE was rated as Excellent.

References

External links
Official website

Research institutes in Portugal
Multidisciplinary research institutes
University of Coimbra
University of Minho